Peter Francis McPoland (born November 3, 2000) is an American singer, songwriter, and musician. In 2021, McPoland signed with Columbia Records. On May 13, 2022, McPoland released his debut EP, Slow Down.

Biography 
Peter Francis McPoland was born on November 3, 2000, in Burlington, Vermont. He moved to Texas when he was seven years old. After picking up the guitar at age fourteen, he taught himself how to play the instrument. Growing up, he was exposed to music from an early age, especially country and folk music. In a 2019 interview, he stated, “both of my parents are very into music, and my father – a lot of my influences come from my father.” He has also stated that his major influences include, John Prine, Bruce Springsteen, Gregory Alan Isakov, and Dire Straits. When McPoland was younger, he planned to be a folk singer, and even asked for a banjo for Christmas, but his parents got him an electric guitar instead. After turning 9 years old, McPoland became involved in various musical theatre productions, which is where he stated that passion for music started.

In 2020, McPoland released his song "Romeo and Juliet", but it was not until March 2021, when he posted an acoustic version of the song on his TikTok, that the video gathered over a million views. The song, along with the video, helped him start his career, and subsequently, in May of the same year, he signed to Columbia Records. Since signing, he has released songs such as "Come Around", "Shit Show", and "News At 9" - among others.

Discography

Extended plays

Singles

Tours

Headlining 
 Peter McPoland Fall Tour (2021)
 The Slow Down Tour (2022)

Opening act 

 The Icy Tour for Twenty One Pilots (2022)

References 

Living people
21st-century American musicians
American singer-songwriters
Columbia Records artists
Musicians from Burlington, Vermont
2000 births